Anna Hahner (born 20 November 1989) is a German long distance runner who specialises in the marathon.

Life

She and her twin sister, Lisa Hahner, were born in 1989. They were inspired to take up long distance running after hearing an interview with musician and amateur runner Joey Kelly when they were seventeen.

Anna Hahner won the Vienna Marathon in 2014 but refused to take part in the European championships. Anna refused because she has set herself a limit of two marathons a year.

Anna competed in the women's marathon event at the 2016 Summer Olympics. She and Lisa controversially crossed the finishing line together at position 81 and 82. They finished more than 15 minutes below their personal bests. They were accused of trying to attract media attention and they did get more coverage than their teammate, Anja Scherl, who finished ahead of them. They said that it was Anna's idea when she realised that with two kilometres to go that she might capture Lisa.

German Athletics Federation director Thomas Kurschilgen said that their aim was just to create attention.

References

External links
 

1989 births
Living people
German female long-distance runners
German female marathon runners
Place of birth missing (living people)
Athletes (track and field) at the 2016 Summer Olympics
Olympic athletes of Germany
21st-century German women
20th-century German women